Solange Fasquelle (14 July 1933 – 15 August 2016) was a French writer. She is the author of more than 20 novels.

Solange Fasquelle was born in Paris, the daughter of Jean, Duke de La Rochefoucauld and Duchess, née Edmée Frisch de Fels. Her first novel, Malconduit, was published in 1959. She won the Cazes Prize in 1961 for Le Congrès d'Aix and the Deux-Magots Prize in 1967 for L'Air de Venise. Among her most famous novels are also Les Amants de Kalyros (1971) and Les Falaises d'Ischia (1977). Her 1974 book Le Trio infernal was made into a film by Francis Girod, starring Michel Piccoli and Romy Schneider. Mère, which was to be her last novel, was published in 2004.

She was elected a member of the Femina Prize jury in 1992, following the steps of her mother, who had died the previous year. She remained on the jury until her death.

She had been the wife of Jean-Claude Fasquelle, chairman of the French publishing house Grasset from 1981 to 2000. Their daughter Ariane Fasquelle was also a publisher, working as head of foreign acquisitions for Grasset, and died in April 2016 before her mother.

References 

1933 births
2016 deaths
Writers from Paris
French women novelists
20th-century French novelists
Prix des Deux Magots winners
20th-century French women writers